Rebecca Rios (born June 4, 1967) is an American Democratic politician who previously served in the Arizona State Senate representing District 27 from 2019 to 2023. She also served in the Arizona House of Representatives, including as Minority Leader.

Career
Rios was a member of the Arizona House of Representatives representing the 27th district and also served as Minority Leader. She previously served as Arizona State Senator for District 23 from 2004 to 2010, and served as Minority Whip. In 2010, she was defeated in a state senate election by Steve Smith.
She was previously a member of the Arizona House of Representatives from 1995 through 2001.

Rios also serves on the Board of Advisors of Let America Vote, an organization founded by former Missouri Secretary of State Jason Kander that aims to end voter suppression. She was elected to the Arizona State Senate in 2018.

Political views
Rios has opposed efforts to add armed and specially trained school personnel to Arizona public schools. She opposes restrictions on abortion rights. Rios has spoken out against an effort led by Louie Gohmert to rename of Cesar Chavez Day to Border Control Day.

References

External links

 Profile at the Arizona Senate
 Rebecca Rios at Project Vote Smart
 
 Follow the Money – Rebecca Rios
 2008 2006 2004 State Senate campaign contributions
 1998 1996 State House campaign contributions
  Public Campaign Profile

|-

1967 births
21st-century American politicians
21st-century American women politicians
Democratic Party Arizona state senators
Democratic Party members of the Arizona House of Representatives
Hispanic and Latino American state legislators in Arizona
Hispanic and Latino American women in politics
Living people
People from Apache Junction, Arizona
Politicians from Tucson, Arizona
Women state legislators in Arizona